Nicholas' Gift is a 1998 drama television film directed by Robert Markowitz and written by Christine Berardo. A co-production between Italy and the United States, it stars Jamie Lee Curtis and Alan Bates as an American couple who, after their son was mortally wounded during a family vacation in Italy, decide to donate the child's organs. The film received positive reviews and earned Curtis a Primetime Emmy Award nomination for her performance.

Plot
Fact based drama about an American couple on vacation in Italy in 1994 with their two children who are attacked and shot by highway bandits. Shortly they discover that their son (named and based on Nicholas Green) is brain dead. The parents are then faced with the hard decision to donate the boy's organs which ultimately led to saving the lives of seven seriously ill Italian patients.

Cast
 Jamie Lee Curtis as Maggie Green
 Alan Bates as Reg Green
 Gene Wexler as Nicholas Green
 Hallie Eisenberg as Eleanor Green
 Isabella Ferrari as Alessandra Grascia
 Anita Zagaria as Anna Bianchi
 Roberto Bisacco as Dr. Cipriano
 Ennio Coltorti as Dr. Santucci
 Nazzareno Costantini as Angelo Bianchi
 Manrico Gammarota as Paolo Bianchi
 Daniele Pio as Stefano Bianchi
 Carlo Cartier as Inspector Tramontana
 Jeremy Zimmermann as Richard Brown

Reception

Critical response
Tom Jicha of the Sun-Sentinel was very positive about the film, describing it as "a wonderfully poignant movie that conveys an important message worthy of the widest possible circulation." In his review for The New York Times, Rick Lyman wrote that "a veteran cast pushing a commendable message is not quite enough to elevate Nicholas' Gift above being a by-the-numbers tear-jerker." The Deseret News praised the film for "superb performances by Jamie Lee Curtis and Alan Bates, tight steering by an award-winning director, an Italian crew schooled in feature film making, an intelligent script based on a riveting real-life story, and an almost religious commitment from everyone involved in the project to make a film worthy of its subjects."

Awards and nominations

References

External links
 

1998 films
1998 drama films
1998 television films
1990s American films
1990s Italian films
1990s English-language films
American drama television films
CBS network films
Italian drama films
Italian television films
Films about child death
Films about families
Films about vacationing
Films directed by Robert Markowitz
Films scored by Carlo Siliotto
Films set in 1994
Films set in Italy
Films shot in Rome
American films based on actual events
Drama films based on actual events
Television films based on actual events